S. K. Sinha may refer to:

 Srinivas Kumar Sinha (1926–2016), Indian army, later ambassador to Nepal, later governor of Assam and Jammu and Kashmir
 Surendra Kumar Sinha (born 1951), Chief Justice of Bangladesh